Matsukaze is a Japanese classical Noh drama.

Matsukaze may also refer to:

 Matsukaze, the legendary horse of Maeda Toshimasu
 Matsukaze, a Danzan-ryū jujitsu technique
 , two Japanese destroyers 
 Masaya Matsukaze, Japanese actor and voice actor
 Matsukaze Tenma, a fictional character in the video game Inazuma Eleven GO
 Super Matsukaze, a Japanese rail service